God Is on My Side is an album by Richie Stephens
 
God Is on My Side may also refer to: 

"God Is on My Side", God Is on My Side 
"God Is on My Side", Breaking God's Heart
"God Is on My Side", Tony Christie